Mission San Diego station is a station on San Diego Trolley's Green Line. The street-level station has side platforms. It is located in the Grantville neighborhood near the Mission San Diego de Alcalá and National University's San Diego campus.

From the station's opening in late 1997, this station was the former terminus for the Blue Line trolleys until the July 2005 introduction of the Green Line service, in conjunction with the opening of the Mission Valley East extension, pushed the Blue Line's terminus back to Old Town Transit Center.

With the Blue Line's truncation, all Green Line trolleys now serve the former portion of the Blue Line from Old Town to this station and points eastward. (A system redesign on September 2, 2012, truncated the Blue Line's terminus farther to the America Plaza station and extended the Green Line's terminus from Old Town to 12th & Imperial Transit Center.)

Station layout
There are two tracks, each served by a side platform.

See also
 List of San Diego Trolley stations

References

Green Line (San Diego Trolley)
San Diego Trolley stations in San Diego
Railway stations in the United States opened in 1997
1997 establishments in California